The Chilean video game content rating system (Spanish: "Calificación de videojuegos", colloquially "Ley de etiquetado de videojuegos"), is a set of decrees that regulate the video game rating for video games sold in Chile since 2018. Chile and Brazil are the only countries in South America to officially adopt a video game content rating system other than the ESRB.

Classification 
The Resolution 5,733 exempted, September, 2014 defines a table of equivalences with other classification systems for homologation purposes: ESRB and PEGI. Decree 51, February, 2017 indicates in its Article 4° a set of acronyms and their description.

The decree mentions that the label must follow some specifications:

 A 150x50 mm rectangle with 1 mm thick black solid line border with a padding of 1 mm (putter rectangle);
 A 146x46 mm rectangle with 3 mm thick black solid line border, centered (inner rectangle);
 The inner rectangle is divided in two rectangles with 30 mm and 107 mm of inner space, respectively;
 A rectangle with unspecified specifications containing the name (usually 0.5 mm thick and margin of 1 mm), inside the left rectangle, at the top, centered;
 The name, in Calibri 12;
 The acronym, in Calibri 85 (however, font size must be adjusted when using the three-character acronym), at the right inner rectangle, centered;
 The description, in Calibri 16, centered, at the right rectangle.

Rating criteria and requirements 
According to the guide published by the Library of Congress,

This means the manufacturers and distributors are required to include the whole label in video games sold in physical format; this does not mention the games distributed in digital format. Some distributors like Microsoft Store in Chile shows just the icon (left rectangle, see the table above) nearly following the specifications in the decree.

Rating agency 
The agency in charge of classifying video games marketed in Chile is the Film Rating Council, which simultaneously maintains its function of rating the films exhibited in Chile. The rating consists of reviewing video games and determining the age of those who can buy or rent them.

Critics 
Jorge Maltrain Macho, from the TodoJuegos magazine, criticized the implementation of this video game content rating system, citing it as "good intention, terrible execution", and "conceived with totally debatable premises", in particular, due to its disagreement between Chilean regulations and their application criteria, and the classifications of the ESRB.

Notes

References

External links 

 Resolution 5733 excepmted, September, 2014 "Table of equivalences of video game classification systems"
 Drecree 51, February, 2017 "Video game labeling decree"
 Law 19426 "Consumer law"
 Law 19846 "Film production rating law"
 Law 20756 "Video games and consoles law"

Video game content ratings systems